Johannes Weber (March 23, 1902 – October 11, 1949) was an SS-Sturmmann and member of staff in Auschwitz concentration camp. He was prosecuted at the Auschwitz Trial.

Weber was born in Wörblitz. He worked as a farmer and a miller. He joined the SS on July 15, 1942 and was assigned to Auschwitz. From November 1942, Weber worked as a chef in the kitchen at Birkenau, initially at the women's camp, then at the men's. On some occasions, he abused prisoners who came into the kitchen for food, particularly gypsies, whom he called "black Jews".

Weber was tried by the Supreme National Tribunal at the Auschwitz Trial in Kraków and was sentenced to 15 years in prison. He died in prison in 1949.

Bibliography 
 Cyprian T., Sawicki J., Siedem wyroków Najwyższego Trybunału Narodowego, Poznań 1962

References

1902 births
1949 deaths
People convicted in the Auschwitz trial
SS personnel
German farmers
Prisoners who died in Polish People's Republic detention
Nazis who died in prison custody
German people convicted of crimes against humanity